The 2021 San Marino Open was a professional tennis tournament played on clay courts. The 28th edition of the tournament, which was part of the 2021 ATP Challenger Tour, took place in City of San Marino, San Marino between 9 and 15 August 2021.

Singles main-draw entrants

Seeds

 1 Rankings are as of 2 August 2021.

Other entrants
The following players received wildcards into the singles main draw:
  Raúl Brancaccio
  Marco De Rossi
  Luca Nardi

The following player received entry into the singles main draw using a protected ranking:
  Julien Cagnina

The following player received entry into the singles main draw as an alternate:
  Malek Jaziri

The following players received entry from the qualifying draw:
  Francesco Forti
  Orlando Luz
  Manuel Mazza
  Julian Ocleppo

The following player received entry as a lucky loser:
  Pavel Kotov

Champions

Singles

 Holger Rune def.  Orlando Luz 1–6, 6–2, 6–3.

Doubles

 Zdeněk Kolář /  Luis David Martínez def.  Rafael Matos /  João Menezes 1–6, 6–3, [10–3].

References

San Marino Open
San Marino GO&FUN Open
San Marino Open
San Marino Open